Odontamblyopus roseus is a species of eel goby native to the coastal waters along the west coast of India.  This species can reach a length of  SL.  Unlike other members of this genus, this species does not have any muscles extending to the top of the skull.

References

Amblyopinae
Fish described in 1837